The following are the national records in speed skating in Brazil maintained by the Brazilian Ice Sports Federation (CBGD).

Men

Women

References

External links
 CBDG website

National records in speed skating
Speed skating-related lists
Speed skating
Speed skating
Speed skating in Brazil
Brazil